The Compañía Cervecera de Canarias (CCC) is a brewery based in Santa Cruz de Tenerife that was founded in 1939 when it started to make a beer that is today called Dorada. In 1994 it merged with the Sociedad Industrial Canaria (Sical) based in Las Palmas de Gran Canaria, which traced it roots back to the La Tropical brewery founded in 1924. Today the company is part of the international group AB InBev, following the successful merger between SAB Miller and AB InBev.

Sociedad Industrial Canaria (Sical)

In 1924, entrepreneur Castor Gómez Navarro founded the brewing company La Tropical in Las Palmas de Gran Canaria, but the start of the Spanish Civil War led to its bankruptcy and it was acquired by a group of entrepreneurs who created the Sociedad Industrial Canaria. The production of this new society went beyond the scope of a brewer, and was involved in other sectors such as coffee, chocolate and fishing.

The opening in 1960 of the Barranco Seco factory in Las Palmas was the beginning of the expansion of the company, becoming the leading company producing beers in the Canaries and one of the largest local businesses. Its product name was Tropical, which continues to be marketed.

Compañía Cervecera de Canarias (Cercasa)

In August 1939, a group of Canarian businessmen headed by Maximino Acea Perdomo founded the first brewery on the island of Tenerife, the Compañía Cervecera de Canarias (Cercasa) in Santa Cruz.

The company launch occurred in turbulent times, Spain was plunged into the war and the rest of the world was preparing for World War II. As a result, the equipment that was purchased in Germany could not reach Tenerife through the end of 1945. In July 1948 the first beer was bottled under the supervision of the German brewmaster Hans Carlos. CCC was the name of that beer, which in the 1960s was renamed Dorada. In the 1970s, a new modern factory opened, contributing to the expansion of the company.

Recent achievements of the brand include being awarded the gold medal by the International Institute for Quality Selections, in its Monde Selection 2011 contest for its Dorada, Dorada Especial and Dorada Sin products. In the International Taste & Quality Institute, an independent organization of chefs and sommeliers based in Brussels, at its Superior Taste Award, Dorada Especial was awarded two stars.

Products 
 Dorada
 Dorada Especial
 Dorada Sin
 Tropical
 Tropical Premium
 Tropical Limón

References

External links 
 Official website (in Spanish)

Beer in Spain
Companies of the Canary Islands
Santa Cruz de Tenerife